The monarchs of Bulgaria ruled the country during three periods of Bulgaria's history as an independent country: from the establishment of the First Bulgarian Empire in 681 to the Byzantine conquest of Bulgaria in 1018; from the Uprising of Asen and Peter that established the Second Bulgarian Empire in 1185 to the annexation of the rump Bulgarian state into the Ottoman Empire in 1396; and from the re-establishment of an independent Principality of Bulgaria in 1878 to the abolition of monarchy in a referendum held on 15 September 1946.

This list does not include the mythical Bulgar rulers and the rulers of Old Great Bulgaria listed in the Nominalia of the Bulgarian rulers, as well as unsuccessful claimants to the throne who are not generally listed among the Bulgarian monarchs, neither rulers of Volga Bulgaria, or other famous Bulgarian rulers as Kuber or Alcek.

Early Bulgarian rulers possibly used the title Kanasubigi (possibly related to Knyaz, Khan) before the 7th century and until the 9th century, possibly read as Kanas U Bigi or Kanas Ubigi, was a title of the early rulers. The title khan for early Bulgar rulers is an assumed one, as only the form kanasubigi or "kanasybigi" is attested in stone inscriptions. Among the proposed translations for the phrase kanasubigi is, more recently, "(ruler) from God", from the Indo-European *su- and  baga-, i.e. *su-baga (an equivalent of the Greek phrase , ho ek Theou archon, which is common in Bulgar inscriptions). This titulature presumably persisted until the Bulgars adopted Christianity. Some Bulgar inscriptions written in Greek and later in Slavonic refer to the Bulgarian ruler respectively with the Greek title archon or the Slavic title Knyaz.

The title Knyaz (Prince) was used for a brief period by Boris I of Bulgaria (and his two successors) after the Christianization of Bulgaria in 864. In Nominalia of the Bulgarian rulers the title Knyaz was also used.

The title tsar, the Bulgarian form of the Latin Caesar, was first adopted and used in Bulgaria by Simeon I the Great (son of Knyaz Boris I), following a decisive victory over the Byzantine Empire in 913. It was also used by all of Simeon I's successors until the fall of Bulgaria under Ottoman rule in 1396. After Bulgaria's liberation from the Ottomans in 1878, its first monarch Alexander I adopted the title knyaz, or prince. However, when de jure independence was proclaimed under his successor Ferdinand in 1908, the title was elevated to the customary tsar once more. However, while the title tsar was translated as "emperor" in the cases of the First and Second Bulgarian Empires, Ferdinand's title was translated as "king." The use of tsar continued under Ferdinand and later under his heirs Boris III and Simeon II until the abolition of monarchy in 1946. 

In the few surviving medieval Bulgarian royal charters, the monarchs of Bulgaria styled themselves as "In Christ the Lord Faithful Emperor and Autocrat of all Bulgarians" or similar variations, sometimes including “... and Romans, Greeks, or Vlachs".

The early Bulgarian ruler Kubrat (632-665), as important allied foreign ruler, was granted the title of Patrikios (Patrician) by the Eastern Roman Emperor. His ring A was inscribed in Greek XOBPATOY and ring C was inscribed XOBPATOY ПATPIKIOY, indicating the dignity of Patrikios (Patrician) that he had achieved in the Byzantine world.

In 705 the Eastern Roman Emperor Justinian II gave the title caesar to the Bulgarian ruler Tervel, the first foreigner to receive this title.

The Pope Innocent III dispatched Cardinal Leo Brancaleoni to Bulgaria in early 1204 to crown Kaloyan with the title of King of the Bulgarians and Vlachs.

Table

First Bulgarian Empire (681–1018)

Proclaimed monarchs during Byzantine rule (1040–1185)

Second Bulgarian Empire (1185–1396)

Principality of Bulgaria and Kingdom of Bulgaria (1878–1946)

See also
Coronation of the Bulgarian monarch
List of Bulgarian consorts
List of prime ministers of Bulgaria
List of presidents of Bulgaria

Notes

Citations

Sources

External links
 Detailed list of Bulgarian rulers (PDF)

Bulgaria
Monarchs
Bulgaria
Monarchs